Companions of Jesus may refer to:
 Apostles of Jesus
 Faithful Companions of Jesus, a Catholic religious order
 Companions of Jehu, a group of militant French anti-Jacobins in the 1790s